John Pierce may refer to:

John Davis Pierce (1797–1882), American minister and legislator
John B. Pierce (1844–1917), American industrialist
John M. Pierce (1886–1958), American amateur astronomer
John L. Pierce (1895–1959), U.S. Army general
John Reeves Pierce (1906–1943), U.S. Navy officer
John R. Pierce (1910–2002), American engineer, professor, and author
John J. Pierce (born 1941), American science fiction editor, son of John R. Pierce
John Pierce (tenor) (born 1959), American operatic tenor
John Pierce (musician), session bassist and member of the group Pablo Cruise
John Pierce (public servant), Australian civil servant
John Pierce (country singer), country musician from Montana

See also 
John Peirce (1836–1897), American inventor and professor of chemistry
John Pearce (disambiguation)
Jack Pierce (disambiguation)